Ned Skeldon Stadium, originally opened as Lucas County Stadium, is a stadium in Maumee, Ohio. It was primarily used for baseball, and was the home field of the Toledo Mud Hens minor league baseball team. It opened for minor league ball in 1965, and closed for the minors in 2002 when the Mud Hens moved to Fifth Third Field. It held 10,197 people. The stadium replaced Swayne Field, which had been demolished after the previous version of the Mud Hens had folded ten years earlier.

Prior to 1965, the ballpark was the racetrack of the Lucas County fairgrounds, a.k.a. Fort Miami Fairgrounds, as far back as 1902. Public official Ned Skeldon persuaded area businessmen to sponsor conversion of the stadium for use as a ballpark, for the purpose of reviving the Mud Hens. The racetrack stands were converted into the third-base stands, and additional seating was constructed around the home plate and first base sides, also suites were added that were called "The Diamond Club". The whole area was redeveloped as the Lucas County Recreation Center.

The scoreboard at "The Ned" was an old Fair Play Scoreboards model with a small four line message board along the bottom in monochrome that would run small (under 20 frame) animations and text throughout the game.

Lucas County Stadium would be the home of the Mud Hens for 37 years. In 1988 the stadium was renamed in honor of Skeldon, a few months before his death. The ballpark is maintained as part of the Lucas County Recreational Center Complex, and continues to be used for amateur baseball.

In 2022 Lucas County approved the demolition of the stadium.
The Stadium was Demolished in March of 2023.

The photo source in the external links calls the Toledo club "Corporal Klinger's favorite team". The team's predecessor during the Korean War played at Swayne Field.

References

External links
Lucas County, OH - Official Website - Rec Center Complex
Stadium Views - Ball Parks of the Minor Leagues
Writeup on Ned Skeldon
Photos of the Stadium
Photos of the old racetrack

Sports venues in Toledo, Ohio
Minor league baseball venues
Sports venues completed in 1935
1935 establishments in Ohio
Baseball venues in Ohio
Buildings and structures in Lucas County, Ohio